Jasraj Singh Hallan  is a Canadian politician who was elected to represent the riding of Calgary Forest Lawn in the House of Commons of Canada in the 2019 Canadian federal election. Born in Dubai to Indian parents, he immigrated to Canada as a child and was raised in Calgary. He is a businessman in Calgary, owning a home building business.

Early Life and Career 
Hallan came to Canada at a very young age. He was the son of two economically disadvantaged parents from Dubai. Hallan grew up as an at-risk youth in NE Calgary and graduated from Lester Pearson High School. He has completed an accounting diploma from SAIT. He also has a certified Master Builder designation and ran a homebuilding business in which he built many homes for families in Calgary.

Politics 
Hallan previous ran in the 2019 Alberta general election for the riding of Calgary-McCall for the United Conservative Party losing to Irfan Sabir.

Following the death of then Member of Parliament for Calgary Forest Lawn, Deepak Obhrai in 2019, the Conservative Party of Canada opened a nomination race for the Conservative Candidacy for Calgary Forest Lawn in the 2019 Canadian Federal Election. The nomination was contested by Obhrai's son, Aman Obhrai, Calgary City Councillor Andre Chabot and Amrit Rai Nannan and was won by Hallan.

Following the nomination Hallan successfully won the riding of Calgary Forest Lawn in the 2019 Canadian Federal Election with almost 60% of the popular vote.

Hallan voted in support of Bill C-233 - an act to amend the Criminal Code (sex-selective abortion), which would make it an indictable or a summary offence for a medical practitioner to knowingly perform an abortion solely on the grounds of the child's genetic sex.

Personal life 
Hallan and his wife still live in the NE and have 2 daughters. Having an immigrant background with a rough childhood, he now dedicates his time to helping youth in his community and immigrants and refugees to Canada. Hallan has previously sponsored a refugee family from Afghanistan in 2019

Electoral record

Federal

Provincial

References

External links

Living people
Businesspeople from Calgary
Conservative Party of Canada MPs
Members of the House of Commons of Canada from Alberta
People from Dubai
Indian emigrants to Canada
Emirati emigrants to Canada
Canadian people of Indian descent
Canadian people of Punjabi descent
Canadian Sikhs
Politicians from Calgary
21st-century Canadian politicians
Year of birth missing (living people)
United Conservative Party candidates